Du und mancher Kamerad is an East German film. It was released in 1956. The film employed archival footage to attempt a connection between Imperial Germany, the government of the Weimar Republic, and the Third Reich to the government of West Germany at the time.

An East German newspaper claimed that the film was well received in the United Kingdom.  It was banned in West Germany and remained so some years after its release; some subsequent films directed by the Thorndikes were banned in Great Britain by the British Board of Film Classification.  The film has an alternate title of Krieg oder Frieden and is the best-known of the Thorndike films.

References

Bibliography

External links
 

1956 films
East German films
1950s German-language films
Films directed by Andrew Thorndike
1950s German films
German black-and-white films